Marino Zanatta (born 8 February 1947) is a retired Italian professional basketball player. In 2014, he was inducted into the Italian Basketball Hall of Fame.

Professional career
Zanatta was a four time EuroLeague champion (1972, 1973, 1975, 1976).

Italian national team
Zanatta was a part of the senior Italian national basketball teams that won bronze medals at the 1971 EuroBasket, and the 1975 EuroBasket. He also competed at the 1972 Summer Olympic Games, and the 1976 Summer Olympic Games, finishing in fourth and fifth place, respectively.

References

External links
FIBA Profile
FIBA Europe Profile
Italian League Profile 

1947 births
Living people
A.S. Junior Pallacanestro Casale players
Basketball players at the 1972 Summer Olympics
Basketball players at the 1976 Summer Olympics
Italian men's basketball players
1970 FIBA World Championship players
Olympic basketball players of Italy
Pallacanestro Milano 1958 players
Pallacanestro Varese players
Shooting guards
Small forwards
Basketball players from Milan